Leptothyrium is a genus of fungi belonging to the order Pleosporales, family unknown.

The genus has an almost cosmopolitan distribution.

Species: (list is highly incomplete)
 Leptothyrium acerigenum 
 Leptothyrium aegiphilae 
 Leptothyrium aegiphilae

References

Fungi